Prince of Darkness is a soundtrack by John Carpenter for the film of the same name. It was released in 1987 through Varèse Sarabande. An expanded edition was released in 2008 through Alan Howarth Incorporated.

Track listing

2008 expanded edition

Personnel
 John Carpenter – composition, performance
 Alan Howarth – synthesizer programming, sequencing, mixing, recording, production

References

John Carpenter soundtracks
1987 soundtrack albums
Horror film soundtracks
Film scores
Varèse Sarabande soundtracks